The Office of the Polish Data Protection Commissioner or officially President of the Personal Data Protection Office (Polish: Prezes Urzędu Ochrony Danych Osobowych, PUODO) is an independent national data protection authority responsible for upholding the European Union fundamental right of individuals to data privacy through the enforcement and monitoring of compliance with data protection legislation in Poland. It was established in 1997 as the Bureau of the General Inspector of the Personal Data Protection (Polish: Biuro Generalnego Inspektora Ochrony Danych Osobowych, GIODO).

The independent role and powers of the national data protection authority are as set out in legislation in the Data Protection Act 2018.

The authority is based in Poland's capital Warsaw, and its commissioner is an independent administrative body elected by members of the Lower House of Polish Parliament (Polish: Sejm) and approved by the Senate. Dr. Edyta Bielak-Jomaa became the first commissioner in 2018, after serving as the general inspector from 2015 to 2018. On 16 May 2019, Jan Nowak was appointed as a new commissioner. The prefix "Minister" (abbreviated to "Min.") is an honorific style that is traditionally used before the names of former and acting general inspectors and commissioners.

Some initiatives of the Polish Data Protection Commissioner's Office include encouraging personal data protection awareness, and promoting data protection education. Office organizes annual essay contest addressed to law students at Polish universities and awards the National Data Protection Commissioner's Prize for best essays on data protection and administrative law.

References

External links
Official Website
LGPD Law Practice

Data protection authorities
Organizations established in 1997